Frederick A. Hodge (1853–1922) was an American businessman and politician.

Born in New Hampshire, Hodge came to Minnesota in 1870. He lived in Pine City, Minnesota and was in the real estate and loan business. He served in the Minnesota State Senate 1894–1898 as a Republican.

Notes

1853 births
1922 deaths
Businesspeople from New Hampshire
People from Pine City, Minnesota
Businesspeople from Minnesota
Republican Party Minnesota state senators